Smokin' Armadillos is an American country music group formed in Bakersfield, California in 1992. Its members are Rick Russell (lead vocals), Josh Graham (guitar, vocals), Scott Meeks (guitar, vocals), Jason Theiste (fiddle, mandolin), Aaron Casida (bass guitar, vocals), and Darrin Kirkindoll (drums).

History
Smokin' Armadillos was founded in 1992 by guitarist Josh Graham, who created a country rap song called "I'm a Cowboy" which he performed at various talent shows before recruiting the rest of the band members. The band recorded a five-song EP called Out of the Burrow in 1995 and after selling more than 150,000 copies of this disc, they signed to Curb Records in 1995. At the time of signing, the band's members ranged in age from 18 to 26.

The group recorded one album for Curb in 1996, which included the chart singles "Let Your Heart Lead Your Mind" and "Thump Factor". A third single, "I Don't Want No Part of It", did not appear on an album. Chuck Howard produced their debut album, and encouraged the band to record some of their own material, including "Let Your Heart Lead Your Mind", which Meeks wrote. The album received mixed-to-positive reviews from Country Standard Time and Allmusic, both of whom praised the musicianship.

In 2005 after 13 years together, the Armadillos went on hiatus, playing their last show together on March 25th at Rabobank Theater in Bakersfield, CA. They reconvened in 2017, releasing "The Other California" in September of that year.

Discography

Albums

Singles

Music videos

References

Country music groups from California
Musical groups from Bakersfield, California
Musical groups established in 1992
Curb Records artists